The Linkou Plateau is a plateau located along the southwest side of the Tamsui River, between Linkou District, New Taipei and Guishan District, Taoyuan, in northern Taiwan. It borders the Taipei Basin in the east, the Taoyuan Plateau in the southwest, the Taiwan Strait in the west, and the Tatun Volcanoes in the northeast. The Xinzhuang Fault (新莊斷層) and Shanjiao Fault (山腳斷層) run between the plateau and the Taipei Basin.

References

Landforms of New Taipei
Plateaus of Taiwan